"Sunday Morning in America" is a song co-written and recorded by American country music artist Keith Anderson.  It was released in May 2007 as the lead single from his album C'mon!. Anderson wrote this song with Jeffrey Steele and Rivers Rutherford.

Content
The song is an uptempo, in which the narrator describes an average Sunday morning in America. He imagines what the morning is like for everybody from a mother who takes the Lord’s name in vain while looking for a church parking space, to a homeless man being ignored by the joggers that run by him.

Critical reception
Kevin John Coyne of Country Universe gave the song a B+ grade, saying that it has two different outlooks based on two different songs, "That's What I Love About Sunday" by Craig Morgan and "Sunday Morning Coming Down" by Johnny Cash. He goes on to say it's "patriotic without being pandering, and captures a wide swath of the American experience." Michael Sudhalter of Country Standard Time in his review of the album, said that the song "represents a cross section of American life on its day of rest."

Chart performance
"Sunday Morning in America" debuted at number 55 on the Billboard Hot Country Songs charts for the week of May 26, 2007.

References

2007 singles
2007 songs
Keith Anderson songs
Songs written by Jeffrey Steele
Songs written by Keith Anderson
Songs written by Rivers Rutherford
Columbia Records singles